The 2013 Point Optical Curling Classic was held from September 27 to 30 at the Nutana Curling Club in Saskatoon, Saskatchewan as part of the 2013–14 World Curling Tour. The event was held in a triple knockout format, and the purse for the event was CAD$50,000, of which the winner, Jeff Stoughton, received CAD$12,000. Stoughton defeated Kevin Martin's team in the final with a score of 6–2. Martin's team was skipped by third Nedohin after Martin went out with a back injury, while Jeff Sharp subbed in as lead.

Teams
The teams are listed as follows:

Knockout results
The draw is listed as follows:

A event

B event

C event

Playoffs

Notes
  Martin's third David Nedohin skipped the team in the final.

References

External links

Point Optical Curling Classic
2013 in Canadian curling
2013 in Saskatchewan